Sandile Dam is a zoned embankment dam located on the Keiskamma River Ezingcuka near Keiskammahoek, Eastern Cape, South Africa. It was established in 1983 and serves mainly for irrigation purposes. The hazard potential of the dam has been ranked high (3).

The dam was named in honour of King Sandile, once the reigning king of the Rharhabe sub-group of the Xhosa nation.

See also
List of reservoirs and dams in South Africa
List of rivers of South Africa

References 

 List of South African Dams from the South African Department of Water Affairs

Dams in South Africa
Dams completed in 1983